Kenneth Ray Lucas (born August 22, 1933) is an American politician. Lucas, a Democrat, was a U.S. Representative from Kentucky's 4th congressional district from 1999 until 2005.

Lucas did not run for reelection in 2004, honoring a promise to serve only three terms. However, he made a bid for his old congressional seat in 2006 against Geoff Davis, the Republican who won the seat in 2004. Lucas narrowly defeated Davis in 2002, even as popular Republican Senator Mitch McConnell breezed to a fourth term in a big midterm cycle for Republicans.

On February 2, 2009, he was appointed as Commissioner of the Kentucky Department of Veterans Affairs by Governor Steve Beshear.

Life and career
Lucas was born in Covington, Kentucky and grew up on a dairy and tobacco farm in Grant County. He attended the University of Kentucky, graduating in 1955. Lucas received his MBA from Xavier University in 1970. He served for 12 years in the Air Force, later serving in the Air National Guard and retiring as a major. He then became a certified financial planner.

From 1967 to 1974, Lucas was a city councilman in Florence; after this, he became a county commissioner in Boone County until 1982. In 1992, he was elected county judge-executive of Boone County, and in 1998 he ran successfully for the House.

Lucas' 1998 victory came as something of a surprise even though Democrats have a substantial majority in registration. He was the first Democrat to represent this district since 1967. Due to the influence of the Cincinnati suburbs, it was widely considered one of the most Republican districts in the South. His victory was even more remarkable since six-term incumbent Jim Bunning made a successful run for the Senate in 1998, winning largely by carrying his old district by a margin that Democrat Scotty Baesler couldn't make up in the rest of the state.

Lucas was reelected in 2000 by 12 points even as the district gave George W. Bush his largest victory margin in the state (the territory currently in the district has not supported a Democrat for President since 1964). He had a far closer race in 2002, when Geoff Davis held him to 51 percent.

Lucas opted not to seek reelection in 2004, having promised to serve only three terms (six years) in Congress. He heavily recruited Cincinnati television personality Nick Clooney to run against Davis in his stead, but Davis defeated Clooney 55% to 45%. A member of the Christian Church (Disciples of Christ), Lucas and his wife Mary have five children.

Run for Congress 2006
Local and national Democratic Party leaders recruited Lucas to make a run for his old seat. He formally announced his candidacy on January 30.

Lucas' entry made the race competitive, despite the 4th's Republican bent. Historically, among the Commonwealth's districts, only the 5th district has been more Republican. The influence of the heavily Republican Cincinnati suburbs kept the district in Republican hands from 1967 until Lucas won the seat in 1998. In August Congressional Quarterly rated the race as "Lean Republican." In late July, the Washington Post also rated the race as a toss-up. A SurveyUSA poll released on July 25, 2006, showed Lucas leading 50% to 41%, although Davis has a decisive lead in fundraising.

Lucas ended up losing to Davis by nine points: 43% to 52%. To date, this is the last time that a Democrat has managed even 40 percent of the vote.

A "Blue-Dog" Democrat
Lucas was one of the most conservative Democrats in the House, as reflected by National Journal rankings. He had a lifetime American Conservative Union rating of 72, the highest of any Democrat in the 108th Congress. However, he shared most Democrats' wariness about privatizing Social Security. He was asked several times to switch parties and become a Republican, but rebuffed these overtures each time.

In a district with a strong social conservative bent, Lucas won his three terms by stressing his conservative social views. He is anti-abortion, pro-gun and against gay marriage. He supported President Bush's tax cuts while in Congress and also voted in favor of going to war in Iraq. He identified as a "Blue Dog Democrat." This comes from the old (Southern) phrase of "Yellow dog Democrats" — people who would vote Democrat even if a yellow dog was the nominee. To distance themselves from attacks (such as being too liberal), they formed the coalition.

References

External links
Entry in the Congressional Biographical Dictionary
AP story on Lucas' entry in 2006 race (from the Lexington Herald-Leader)
 FEC — contributions to Lucas

1933 births
Aviators from Kentucky
American Disciples of Christ
County judges in Kentucky
Living people
Military personnel from Kentucky
People from Florence, Kentucky
Politicians from Covington, Kentucky
People from Grant County, Kentucky
United States Air Force officers
University of Kentucky alumni
Xavier University alumni
Democratic Party members of the United States House of Representatives from Kentucky
21st-century American politicians